The 2019 Football Championship of Kirovohrad Oblast was won by FC Zirka Kropyvnytskyi.

League table

 FC Zirka Kropyvnytskyi played in the 2019–20 Ukrainian Football Amateur League.

References

Football
Kirovohrad
Kirovohrad